is a Japanese gravure idol and a female talent. She is from Saitama.

Bibliography

Photographs 
 Yureru Omoi (ゆれる想い), 2005 
 Melon Chan!, 2006

Magazines 
 Asa-gei Secret Vol.18, 2010

Filmography

Movies 
 [Kekko Kamen] Royale, 2007
 [Kekko Kamen] Premium, 2007
 [Kekko Kamen] Forever, 2007
 Trick House, 2008

Image videos released as Hitomi Kitamura 
 Yureru Omoi (ゆれる想い), 2005 
 Melon Chan!, 2006 
 Marshmallow  (マシュマロ), 2006 
 Hatachi no Hitomi (二十歳の瞳), 2006 
 Nittelegenic 2006 Mune Ippai no Ai wo (日テレジェニック2006　胸いっぱいの愛を), 2006
 Nittelegenic 2006 Mémoires <Memoir> (日テレジェニック2006 Mémoires＜メモアール＞), 2007
 Yawaraka na Hitomi (やわらかなひとみ), 2007 
 Tsubura na Hitomi (つぶらなひとみ), 2007 
 SWEETIE, 2007
 HIT me!, 2007
 Purin a la Mode (ぷりんアラモード), 2008
 Tappuri Purin a la Mode (たっぷりぷりんアラモード), 2008
 Avangals!, 2008
 Collage, 2008 With Ryoko Mitsui
 Kagayaku Hi. To. Mi. (輝くひ・と・み), 2008
 Hazumu Hitomi (弾むひとみ), 2009
 Itoshi no Hitomi (愛しのひとみ), 2009
 Meromeron (メロメロ～ン), 2009
 Torokeru Kajitsu (とろける果実), 2009
 Ponyo Ponyo Wonderland (ポニョポニョわんだーらんど), 2010
 Ponyo Ponyo Wonderland 2 (ポニョポニョわんだーらんど2), 2010

Image videos released as Tama Mizuki 
 SWINUTION, 2010
 Puru Puru Purun (ぷるぷるぷるん), 2010
 TUYA-TAMA (艶珠 TUYA-TAMA), 2011
 Peach Bomb, 2011
 Mizuki no Kimochi (水樹のキモチ), 2011
 Yureru Suicup (ゆれるすいかっぷ), 2012
 Mizutama (みずたま), 2012
 Tamapelo! (たまペロッ!), 2012

DVD box sets
 4 Pieces BOX, 2009

Discography

Singles
 Hito -> P Trance – Yurechau Hitomi~ (ひとP→トランス～ゆれちゃうひとみ～), 2007
 Hitomi ni Dokkin Yasashiku Mitsumete~ (ひとみにドッキン☆～やさしく見つめて～), 2007

Albums 
 GIRLS' PARTY SUPER BEST, 2007
 Romance no Kami-sama ~Be Myself~ (ロマンスの神様~Be myself~), 2008

Miscellaneous
 Air Idol, 2007

References

External links 
 Avilla – Her talent agency
 Hitomi Kitamura Ameba – Official Blog while her stage name was Hitomi Kitamura.
 Tama Mizuki Ameba – Official Blog while her stage name is Tama Mizuki.

Japanese gravure models
Japanese television personalities
1985 births
Living people
Models from Saitama Prefecture